Segui or Seguí may refer to:
Seguí, a village in Argentina
Diego Seguí (born 1937), Cuban-born former MLB pitcher
David Segui (born 1966), Diego Seguí's son, former MLB first baseman
Antonio Seguí (born 1934), Argentine painter and printmaker